The Progressive National Party is a political party in the Turks and Caicos Islands, currently led by Washington Misick. The PNP holds 14 of the 15 seats in the House of Assembly and has been the government since 20 Feb 2021.

History 
More Information: The PNP: A History

Origins 
Before party politics was introduced in the Turks and Caicos, a group called the Progressive National Organisation (PNO) was advocating for constitutional reform that would allow for local people to be elected to government roles to represent themselves rather than the old system of UK appointees having the final say in all matters. The advocates for these changes included Hon. NJS Francis and Headley Durham of Grand Turk; Alexander Henry "Shorty" Smith of Salt Cay; Hon. Hilly Ewing of Providenciales; Charles Nathaniel Misick of North Caicos; and Dan Malcolm and Hon. Norman Saunders of South Caicos. These men would go on to be the founding members of the PNO and subsequently petitioned, organised, and paid for the 1976 constitution that made party politics possible and made a big step towards the autonomy and independence they all longed for.

Electoral history

1976 election 
Once the constitution was in full effect, the PNO became the Progressive National Party and Norman Saunders was elected leader of the party.

Neither the PNP nor the opposing party, People's Democratic Movement (PDM), won the election as six (6) seats were necessary to declare victory. The PDM had won five and the PNP won four and two seats were held by independent candidates. Liam McGuire of South Caicos, one of the independent candidates, approached the PNP alongside Danny Williams of North Caicos requesting to be given the role of Minister of Development in exchange for joining the party and giving them the seats needed to secure the victory. The PNP unanimously declined as they saw McGuire as a "foreigner" who "should not hold a permanent office in the government." McGuire refused to take a non-ministerial role and, with Williams, joined the PDM making them the first government of the TCI.

2003 election 
At the 2003 legislative elections, the party won six out of 13 seats. It won two extra seats at a by-election on 7 August 2003, bringing the party to power.

2007 election 
In the 9 February 2007 elections the party won 13 out of 15 seats, the largest margin in history until the 2021 general election.

2016 election 
Their 2016 election opponents were the People's Democratic Movement and the Progressive Democratic Alliance.

Electoral performance

References

External links
Official web site



Political parties in the Turks and Caicos Islands
Christian democratic parties in North America